The UK Singles Downloads Chart is a weekly music chart that ranks most-downloaded songs in the United Kingdom over the past seven days. It is compiled by the Official Charts Company on behalf of the British music industry, and is based solely on non-subscription downloads of songs from official music retailers. The chart was founded in 2004 and was first published on 1 September that year. The first artist ever to reach number one was Irish boy band Westlife. Since then, 200 different artists have reached number-one on the UK Singles Downloads Chart as either a main or featured artist. The following table lists those artists. The totals do not include non-credited appearances (such as those on multiple-artist charity ensembles), although they are listed below.

Artists

Most number ones

Since its inception in 2004, Four different artists have reached number-one on the UK Singles Downloads Chart with eight or more singles. To qualify for entry on this list, the act must have been credited as an artist on eight or more number one singles, as recognised by the Official Charts Company. The list does not include credits on multiple-artist charity ensembles. The most successful artist is Ed Sheeran, who has been credited on 14 different number-one singles on the download chart.

Songs with most weeks at number one
This is a list of most weeks at number one by song main artist only.

One-hit wonders
For the purposes of this list, a one-hit wonder is defined as an act that has reached number one on the UK Official Download Chart but has not charted with any other single either before or since.

As a featured artist

Ensemble groups

See also
Lists of one-hit wonders

References
General

Specific

External links
Singles Download Chart at the Official Charts Company

British music-related lists
UK Official Download Chart
UK singles